Stella Chinyere Mbachu  (born 16 April 1978) is a Nigerian professional soccer player born in 1978 in Nigeria.

References

1978 births
Living people
Nigerian women's footballers
Rivers Angels F.C. players
Nigeria women's international footballers
1999 FIFA Women's World Cup players
2003 FIFA Women's World Cup players
2007 FIFA Women's World Cup players
2011 FIFA Women's World Cup players
Olympic footballers of Nigeria
Footballers at the 2000 Summer Olympics
Footballers at the 2004 Summer Olympics
Footballers at the 2008 Summer Olympics
Women's association football forwards
Sportspeople from Imo State
Igbo people